The Klickitat War was a conflict between the United States and the Klickitat Indians and the Cascade people that occurred in 1855.  

The Klickitat were living along the Columbia River on the plateau in central Washington Territory, on land in the path of white settlement.  The governor of Washington Territory, Isaac Stevens, used a careful combination of intimidation and force to compel the Native American tribes of Washington Territory to sign treaties that handed over most of their lands and rights to Stevens' government.  When Stevens was met with resistance, he used the troops at his disposal to pacify the region into submission.

The war was fought in the high bluffs that overlook the Columbia River and ended in 1855.  The Klickitat and the Cascade people were removed from their lands.

Sources
Earthisland.org Source

Conflicts in 1855
Wars between the United States and Native Americans
1855 in the United States
Native American history of Washington (state)
1855 in Washington Territory